Joseph Moravsky Jr. is an American athlete, meteorologist, and Manager at Stamford Ninja Academy who has competed on American Ninja Warrior in seasons five through fourteen. He has twice been the Last Ninja Standing on American Ninja Warrior and has competed on USA Network's Team Ninja Warrior season one and winning season two.

American Ninja Warrior
In the fifth season, Moravsky's qualifier run was fast forwarded, but placed sixth with a time of 1:25.95 and moved on to city finals as the fastest rookie in Baltimore, according to Matt Iseman. In the city finals, Moravsky placed second and completed the course with a time of 3:11.97. At the national finals, he successfully completed with 36.23 seconds left, the 4th fastest time overall.  During Stage 2, Joe was the first finisher. When Joe moved on to Stage 3, where he fell on the third obstacle, the Floating Boards, when failing to make the transition to the fourth board, he placed second overall, the only person to beat him was Brian Arnold. He was engaged to his wife Stephanie at the time.

Moravsky planned to marry his wife Stephanie after the city finals in season six but before the national finals. However, his wedding was delayed due to the national finals taping overlapping their wedding date. During St. Louis qualifiers, he finished the course with the fastest time of the night with 1:04.13 on the clock. At the city finals, despite breaking the Rumbling Dice, he once again finished with the fastest time of the night with 3:40.48. During Stage 1 of the national finals, he finished with 29.79 left on the clock, the fourth fastest time. On Stage 2, he was one of two finishers. He barely finished, however, with only over a second left on the clock when he hit the buzzer. On Stage 3, he became the third American to complete the Ultimate Cliffhanger, and fell on the Hang Climb. Despite the fall, he was the Last Man Standing.

Moravsky was selected for the USA vs. The World competition, where he was part of Team USA, along with Brian Arnold, Elet Hall, Paul Kasemir, and Travis Rosen. He competed on Stage 1, where he completed the course with a time of 1 minute 12 seconds, beating Brent Steffensen’s record in earlier years. However, Tim Shieff completed the course in a different heat with 1 minute 2 seconds. Joe still holds the fastest time an American has beaten Stage 1. On Stage 3, he fell on the Hang Climb again and lost the heat.

Moravsky and his wife Stephanie were getting ready to have their first child.

In the Pittsburgh qualifiers of season seven, he ended up with the second fastest time with 1:34.17, just behind Elet Hall.  In the city finals, he ended up with the second fastest time again of 7:28.92, this time behind Geoff Britten. In Las Vegas during the national finals, Joe beat Stage 1 with 35.31 seconds left which was the sixth fastest overall. He was the last of the 8 competitors to complete Stage 2. Joe completed Stage 2 with 20.41 left, the fourth fastest time. When he advanced to Stage Three, he placed fifth when he fell on the Ultimate Cliffhanger transitioning to the final ledge. In USA vs. The World, Moravsky was once again part of Team USA, this time along with Isaac Caldiero, Kevin Bull, Geoff Britten, Drew Drechsel, and Ian Dory. He ran on Stage 2 and Stage 3.

Beginning Season 8 in Philadelphia, in the qualifiers he put up the third fastest time behind Anthony DeFranco and Jon Alexis Jr. with a time of 2:00.29. In city finals, while no one completed the course, he placed second behind Chris Wilczewski failing at the Invisible ladder. At the national finals, he completed Stage 1 slower than before with only over 4 seconds left, and placed 15th out of 17 finishers. On Stage 2, he shockingly suffered his first fall that wasn't on Stage 3 when he fell on the Wave Runner, ending his season early.

Before season nine, his uncle, Rob, died. This became his main motivation for the season. In an interview, he talked about the season and not having family at qualifiers and city finals. He also talked about the course and why he's confident every time he heads in. In Cleveland qualifying, he placed second, one second behind Anthony DeFranco with a time of 2:32.77. During the city finals, he became one of only two people to beat the Nail Clipper. He finished at the top of the leaderboard for the first time in a while, with a time of 7:24.10, over one minute faster than Jamie Rahn. At Stage 1 in Vegas, he beat the course with plenty of time putting up the sixth fastest time with 42.76 seconds left on the clock by the time he finished. He became one of forty-one finishers advancing to Stage 2 once again. On that course, he was one of three people to finish, having 25.66 seconds left. On Stage 3 for the fourth time in the regular season, he made it further than ever before, beating new and modified obstacles but ultimately fell short when he fell on the Time Bomb. Despite that, he was the Last Man Standing for the second time.

Personal life
Moravsky studied meteorology at Western Connecticut State University and used to be seen frequently as a freelance meteorologist at News 12 Connecticut. He currently travels in partnership with Ninja Coalition doing special events and coaching and works as a manager at Stamford Ninja Academy in Stamford, Connecticut. Moravsky is currently married and has three kids with his wife, Stephanie.

References

Living people
American Ninja Warrior contestants
1989 births
American meteorologists